HMS Merlin was the name ship of her class of three 2-gun paddle packet boats built for the Royal Navy during the 1830s. She was converted into a survey ship in 1854 and then into a gunvessel two years later. The ship was decommissioned in 1858 and was sold into commercial service in 1863.

Description
The ship's tonnage was 889  tons burthen. The Medusa class was fitted with a pair of steam engines, rated at 312 nominal horsepower, that drove their paddlewheels. The ships were armed with a pair of 6-pounder carronades.

Construction and career
Merlin, the twelfth ship of her name to serve in the Royal Navy, was ordered on 10 March 1838, laid down the following month at Pembroke Dockyard, Wales, and launched on 18 September 1838. She was completed in April 1839 and commissioned on 20 April. The ship was initially based at Liverpool for packet service in the Irish Sea. Merlin was modified in 1848 for service in the Mediterranean Sea.

She was converted into a survey vessel in 1854 and was transferred to the Baltic Sea the following year. The ship was converted into a gunboat in 1856 and was transferred to the West Coast of Africa Station in May of that year. Merlin was paid off on 23 April 1858, listed for sale on 18 September 1861 and sold on 18 May 1863. Her purchaser, A. E. Williams & Co., intended to use her for commercial service and renamed her Sea Hawk.

Notes

References

External links
 

Merlin-class packet boat
1838 ships
Ships built in Pembroke Dock
Crimean War naval ships of the United Kingdom